The International Freeski Film Festival (iF3) is a film Festival dedicated to screening and rewarding freeskiing and snowboarding movies. Held annually at the end of October in Montreal, iF3 was created in 2007 by Félix Rioux, Doug Bishop and Jean-Francis Durocher. As it premieres the best movies of the past season, iF3 has been referred to as the "Cannes of the ski world!" by ESPN and won Quebec action sports Gala Maestro's event of the year in 2010.

History

Origins and purpose 

iF3 stemmed from its founders’ will to unite all elements that compose freeskiing culture in one place, such as ski cinematography, producers, athletes, photography, brands, music, art and parties. The stated mission of the festival is to, recognize  the best of what the freeski community has to offer through innovative and entertaining media and events in order to unite sport with culture and expand it to new levels. 
Each year athletes, filmmakers, industry leaders and ski enthusiasts get together for a long weekend of celebration, kicking off the upcoming season.

Key players 

The International Freeski Film Festival (iF3) was created in 2007   by   ski industry veterans: professional photographer Félix Rioux, Newschoolers publisher Doug Bishop, and Bite Size Entertainment's Jean-Francis Durocher. In 2009, after the third edition of the festival, Bishop left the team, followed by Jean-Francis Durocher in 2011. Luc "Skypowder" is currently the President of the festival.

Evolution 

Gradually, iF3 became the biggest gathering of independent movie productions in skiing and draws producers, athletes, and event attendees from more than 20 countries. Both fan participation and video submission have increased every year since  inception. The roster has grown from 11 professional and 5 amateur entries in 2007 for the first edition to over 100 professional and amateur films, shorts, and documentaries in 2018.

iF3 Movie Awards

Ceremonies 

The iF3 Movie Awards ceremonies show venue in Montreal. An international jury panel reviews all the movies submitted online prior to the event, and  the awards to be announced and given during the festival in Montreal. 
The film producers, production teams and athletes who win  receive an emblematic ski-shaped trophy known as the iF3 Palm alongside various gifts. In 2019, the iF3 Movie Awards will take place on Saturday October 19, at Bain Mathieu in Montreal.

Categories 

Recurrent categories:

Professional Category (Ski / Snowboard)
 Film of the Year
 Best Cinematography
 Best Editing
 Best Short Movie (10-30min)

Specific production companies are invited by iF3 to submit their films to the professional category, but submissions from additional production companies are also accepted.

Characteristics of the professional category:
 Professionally athletes
 Significant external funding and sponsorship
 Professional cinematographers
 Professional editing
 The revenue and sponsorship income are sufficient to financially support the parties involved
 The production company is run as a business

Amateur Category (Ski / Snowboard)
 Film Of The Year
 Best Cinematography

Characteristics of the amateur category:
 Athlete sponsorship is not a requirement
 Relatively small external funding, if any
 Relatively small distribution, if any.
 Revenue and sponsorship income is insufficient or barely sufficient to financially support the parties involved.
 The film cannot exceed 40 minutes

Athlete Category ( Ski / Snowboard)
 Best Female Performance
 Best Male Street Segment
 Best Male Freeride Segment
 Discovery of the year

Open Category (Ski & Snowboard movies)
 Best Big Mountain Film
 Best Urban Movie
 Best Storytelling
 Bern Best Crash
 Jury's Pick
 Best Short Video (under 10min)

Past winners

2018 Edition 

iF3 INTERNATIONAL MONTREAL from October 18 to 20

2017 Edition 

iF3 INTERNATIONAL MONTREAL from October 26 to 29

2015 Edition 

iF3 INTERNATIONAL MONTREAL from September 24 to 26

2014 Edition 

iF3 INTERNATIONAL MONTREAL from September 18 to 20

2013 Edition 

iF3 INTERNATIONAL MONTREAL from September 11 to 15
iF3 EUROPE ANNECY from September 27 to 29

2012 Edition 

iF3 INTERNATIONAL MONTREAL from September 12 to 16
iF3 EUROPE ANNECY from September 28 to 30

2011 Edition 

iF3 INTERNATIONAL MONTREAL from September 15 to 18 
iF3 EUROPE ANNECY from September 30 to October 3

2010 Edition 

iF3 INTERNATIONAL MONTREAL from September 16 to 19
iF3 EUROPE ANNECY from September 30 to October 3

2009 Edition 

iF3 INTERNATIONAL MONTREAL from September 17 to 20

2008 Edition 

iF3 INTERNATIONAL MONTREAL from September 11 to 15

2007 Edition 

iF3 INTERNATIONAL MONTREAL from September 13 to 15

European edition 

iF3 Europe in Annecy was the first iF3 to take place outside of  Montreal  at the   end of September 2010. In 2014, following the expansion of the event worldwide, Like That Agency, the agency holding the licence of the European edition,   organized its own event, the High Five Festival. A series of exclusive awards used to be attributed in  Annecy, ranging from Europe-specific awards to  Photography awards.

World Tour 

In addition,  iF3 has organized events in several other cities including Innsbruck, Le Massif, London, Mont-Tremblant, Amsterdam, Tokyo, Santiago, Stockholm and Whistler.
In 2019 the festival will be taking place in Santiago, Chile in July 2019 and in Montreal, Québec and Whistler this fall.

References

External links 
 IF3

Film festivals in Montreal
Sports film awards
Sport in Montreal